The Kalibo Integrated Special Education Center, formerly Kalibo Elementary School II (KES II) / Kalibo Elementary School II (Aklan Special Education Center), is a public integrated school in Kalibo supervised by the Department of Education. It is located in XIX Martyrs Street, Poblacion, Kalibo, Aklan, Philippines.

History
In 1999, the then Aklan Schools Division Superintendent Dr. Reynalda I. Magdaluyo, authorized the splitting of Kalibo Elementary School into two schools namely: Kalibo Elementary School I (KES I) and Kalibo Elementary School II (KES II). Remia H. Donguines, the school's founder, was appointed as the first principal of the newly instituted KES II.  KES II opened the school year in June 1999 with two regular classes/sections for each level from Kinder to Grade 6 and a Special Education (SpEd) class for visually impaired pupils.  The SpEd class for visually impaired pupils was pioneered by Johann C. Cawaling. The school produced 101 elementary graduates in its first school year of operations.

Subsequently, the school's SpEd curriculum expanded rapidly. From one class for visually impaired students, SpEd classes were also opened for the gifted and talented, hearing impaired, mentally retarded, etc. The school became the only one in the entire province of Aklan that caters to children with special needs such as visually impaired, hearing impaired and mentally retarded.  With this, the school's name was expanded to Kalibo Elementary School II (Aklan Special Education Center) to highlight its being the center of special education in the entire province. Meanwhile, its regular classes have continued producing graduates who have excelled in their secondary.

By 2009, the school's 10th year, the school has produced 20 SpEd graduates who are eligible to enroll in high school.  However, there is a lack of secondary education institution in the province that can accommodate them.  This prompted the General Parents, Teachers and Community Association (PTCA) of KES II (Aklan Special Education Center) to initiate the ground work for the conversion of the institution from an elementary school into an integrated school by passing a resolution. The Sangguniang Barangay of Poblacion Kalibo and the Sangguniang Bayan of Kalibo endorsed a similar resolution supporting the move

Finally, on July 26, 2011, Dr. Mildred L. Garay, Regional Director of the Department of Education, Region 6 acting for the Secretary of Education issued Government Recognition (RO VI) No. I-001 s. 2011 that recognizes the school as a “Public Integrated School” and the change in name to Kalibo Integrated Special Education Center (KISEC), effective April 29, 2009.

In 2013, the Department of Education hailed KISEC as Brigada Eskwela Hall of Fame Awardee for consistently winning as Best Brigada Eskwela Implementer for 6 years from 2006 to 2012. Brigada Eskwela is a nationwide volunteer and community service program which started in 2003 that engages the stakeholders and hundreds of volunteers for the cleaning, refitting, and rebuilding classrooms.

From its humble beginnings as KES II in 1999, KISEC has come a long way. It has expanded to three departments namely: Elementary, Secondary (High School) and Special Education.  KISEC has also positioned itself as the center of special education in the capital town of Kalibo and in the Province of Aklan while continuously producing graduates who have become successful professionals, board topnotchers, world class athletes, artists, performers and contributing citizens of the country from its regular classes. 
 
KISEC is supervised by the Department of Education under the District of Kalibo II, Division of Aklan, Region VI - Western Visayas. Wilma Werigene M. Villa, Principal II, one of the pioneer teachers of the school is now the school principal.

Faculty and administration
From its establishment, the institution had its founder Remia H. Donguines as its principal, until her retirement. She was replaced by current principal Wilma Werigene M. Villa, one of the pioneer teachers of the institution.

Academics

Curriculum
The school is following the new curriculum by the Department of Education, the Enhanced K to 12 Curriculum, as of the school year 2012–2013.

Publications
The Wit's Pen - official elementary publication

Athletics
KISEC is the school of 2017 ASEAN Para-swimming bronze medalist Claire Calizo.

References

External links
Official KISEC Facebook page

Schools in Aklan
Educational institutions established in 1999
1999 establishments in the Philippines